Sri Lanka Freedom Socialist Party was a political party in Sri Lanka. SLFSP was formed in 1964 by C. P. de Silva when he broke away from the Sri Lanka Freedom Party. In the 1965 elections, SLFSP contested in coalition with the United National Party. In total SLFSP had 32 candidates, who received a total of 130 429 votes (3.2% of the nationwide vote). Five MPs were elected from the party. SLFSP joined the coalition government led by UNP.

SLFSP amalgamated the Lanka Prajathanthravadi Pakshaya. Soon thereafter SLFSP merged into UNP.

Electoral history

1964 establishments in Ceylon
Defunct political parties in Sri Lanka
Political parties established in 1964
Political parties in Sri Lanka
Socialist parties in Sri Lanka